Sauveur Abel Aubert Petit de la Saussaye (1792–1870) was a malacologist from France. His surname is: Petit de la Saussaye.

From 1850 to 1853 he was editor of the Journal de Conchyliologie. He was the author of the following:
 Notice à l'usage des personnes qui s'occupent de la recherche des coquilles, 1838 – Instructions of usage for persons involved in the search for shells. 
 Catalogue des mollusques testacés des mers d'Europe, 1869 – Catalog of shelled mollusks found in the seas of Europe.

Species described 
Species and genera described by Sauveur Abel Aubert Petit de la Saussaye include (in chronology order):
 Rimellopsis powisii (Petit de la Saussaye, 1840)
 Thais capensis Petit de la Saussaye, 1852
 Triton loroisii Petit de la Saussaye, 1852 is a synonym for Turritriton labiosus (Wood, 1828)
 Recluzia Petit de la Saussaye, 1853
 Zophos baudoni (Petit de la Saussaye, 1853)
 Fusinus couei (Petit de la Saussaye, 1853)
 Xenophora caribaea Petit de la Saussaye, 1857
 Acteon senegalensis (Petit de la Saussaye, 1851)

References

French malacologists
1792 births
1870 deaths